Hayes Hall may refer to:
Edmund B. Hayes Hall, a building at the University at Buffalo on the National Register of Historic Places
Hayes Hall, a building at the Ohio State University
Hays Hall, a former residence hall at Washington & Jefferson College